The Ninth Man is a 1931 thriller play by Frederick J. Jackson.

It premiered at the Theatre Royal in Brighton before transferring to the West End where it ran for 45 performances at the Prince of Wales Theatre and the Duke of York's Theatre. The cast included John Longden, Nora Swinburne, Rex Harrison and Edward Ashley-Cooper.

References

Bibliography
 Wearing, J.P. The London Stage 1930-1939: A Calendar of Productions, Performers, and Personnel.  Rowman & Littlefield, 2014.

1931 plays
British plays
Thriller plays
West End plays